Adelaide River ephemerovirus is a negative-sense single-stranded RNA virus of the family Rhabdoviridae. The virus's primary hosts are all bovine, including domestic water buffalo, and cape buffalo.

The nucleotide sequence of the ARV (Adelaide River virus) genome was derived from the 3` terminus to the end of the nucleoprotein gene.

References

 Uniprot.org entry for Adelaide River virus

Animal viral diseases
Rhabdoviridae
Bovine diseases